This is a list of countries according to the best position achieved by athletes of these nations at major world tournaments in roller hockey. The variations of hockey included here are quad (also known as rink hockey) and inline hockey. Aside from the best results achieved at the world championships for each variation, also included are results from the World Games and the World Roller Games. Medals earned by athletes from defunct NOCs or historical teams have been merged with the results achieved by their immediate successor states, as follows: Czech Republic inherits medals from Czechoslovakia and Germany inherits medals from West Germany. Medals earned by teams from England are merged with results from Great Britain. Results achieved in youth, junior or U20 events were not considered for the making of this table, neither were para adaptations of hockey (power hockey).

Results

See also 
 List of major achievements in sports by nation

References 
 Sports123: Inline Hockey (archived)
 Sports123: Roller Hockey (archived)

Roller hockey
Roller hockey
Inline hockey
Roller hockey competitions